West Prongs consists of three distinctive rock spurs that form the west end of the ridge just north of Elliott Ridge in the Neptune Range, Pensacola Mountains. Mapped by United States Geological Survey (USGS) from surveys and U.S. Navy air photos, 1956–66. It was named by Advisory Committee on Antarctic Names (US-ACAN) for Clyde E. West, cook at Ellsworth Station, winter 1958.

Ridges of Queen Elizabeth Land